Rémy is a commune in the department of Pas-de-Calais in the Hauts-de-France region of France.

Geography

Population

Places of interest
 The church of St-Léger, rebuilt, along with the rest of the village, after the First World War.
 A watermill.

See also
Communes of the Pas-de-Calais department

References

Communes of Pas-de-Calais